Embakasi North is a constituency in Kenya. It is one of seventeen constituencies in Nairobi County. Embakasi North includes five electoral wards: Kariobangi North, Dandora Area I, Dandora Area II, Dandora Area III, and Dandora Area IV. It was created prior to the 2013 election when Kasarani Constituency and Embakasi Constituency boundaries were revised.

References 

Constituencies in Nairobi